The Bird-class patrol vessels were a class of seaward patrol vessels operated by the Royal Canadian Navy (RCN) during the Cold War. The class derives its name from large birds found in Canada and was designed by the RCN as a replacement for the remaining Second World War-era Fairmile motor launches used for coastal patrol.

Design
Bird-class patrol vessels were designed for harbour patrol, training and anti-submarine warfare. Constructed of wood and aluminum, the Bird class displaced . They had a complement of two officers and nineteen ratings.

The Bird class were powered by diesel engines creating  connected to two shafts. The vessels were armed with one 20 mm gun and a Hedgehog anti-submarine mortar.

Ships

Service history
Loon was the first to commission, on 30 November 1955 at Toronto, Ontario. The vessel sailed to Halifax, Nova Scotia in December through treacherous ice conditions. Cormorant and Mallard were commissioned on 16 July 1956 at Midland, Ontario and Penetang, Ontario respectively. Blue Heron commissioned on 30 July 1956 at Orillia, Ontario and was allocated to the Royal Canadian Mounted Police Marine Division based at Halifax.

In 1961, Cormorant, Mallard and Loon were assigned to Atlantic Command as harbour patrol craft. In April 1961, Mallard was deployed to rescue the crew of the fishing vessel Ocean Wave which had run aground off Nova Scotia. The heavy seas prevented rescue by ship and the crew were taken off by helicopter.

References

Notes

Sources

External links
 Bird Class – Radio Fit – Radio Research Paper

 
Patrol boat classes